The Wheaton College Men's Glee Club is an all-male glee club (or choir), at Wheaton College in Wheaton, Illinois currently conducted by Dr. Jerry Blackstone.

Founded in 1907, the Men's Glee Club has maintained a long tradition of traditions under its three founding pillars: veritas, integritas, and fraternitas.  The group is composed of around 60 men who hail from many different areas of study and many different parts of the world.  They perform a wide range of sacred and secular repertoire, from the traditional MGC processional "Rise Up, O Men of God!" to the Scottish folk song "Loch Lomond."

History

Early years
The first Men's Glee Club was organized in 1907 under the leadership of Miss Virginia
Graham. The activity and size of this organization was seriously limited throughout the
First World War.  The Club was reorganized in 1921 under Professor George Karzenborn,
who directed the group until 1927. In 1925 the Men's Glee Club made its first broadcast
over WLS, "the Sears Roebuck station in Chicago." Later, the Glee Club was heard on the
same station in 1961, when it sang on the College's "Chapel on the Campus" summer
programs on Sundays.

Professor Leroy Hamps served as Club director from 1927 to 1931. During this period the
Glee Club members sang with the Women's Glee Club (now Women's Chorale) for the
first time (1928) and took their first out-of-state tour (1929). The practice of extended
tours began in 1931 when Dr. William "Uncle Bill" Nordin accompanied the first tour to
the East Coast from Boston to Philadelphia.  Both Men's and Women's Clubs toured the
East again in 1933. The first West Coast tour was in 1937.

Halvorsen years
In 1958, Professor Clayton E. Halvorsen became director of the Glee Club. During his tenure, the group continued to tour the United States; it also began touring Europe in 1963. During those foreign tours the club has sung in Notre Dame Cathedral in Paris, Grossmunster in Zurich, and
before Queen Juliana of the Netherlands; the Men's Glee Club also performed
in Soviet and Eastern Bloc countries while the Iron Curtain was still in existence.

In 1979 and again in 1983, the group won first prize in the male chorus division at the International
Choral Festival in The Hague, the Netherlands. On its European tour in 1983, the Club
won two first prizes at the International Choirfest in Limberg, West Germany. From 1984
until recently, the Glee Club sang the national anthem at the Chicago Bears' football
games, and in February 1988, the Glee Club performed at the National Prayer Breakfast in Washington, D.C.

Recent history
In 1988, Dr. Gerard B. Sundberg came from Minnesota's Bethel College to become the
sixth conductor of the Club. Under Dr. Sundberg's direction the group completed tours to
Ontario, New York, Pennsylvania, Texas, Louisiana, Florida, Minnesota, California,
Colorado, the West Coast, and the Southeastern States. In 1991, Dr. Sundberg's First
European tour with the Glee Club highlighted performances in Bach's church in Leipzig,
the Kaiser Wilheim Memorial Cathedral in Berlin, and in the Filedelfia Church in
Stockholm. The Glee Club collaborated with the Women's Chorale in several pops
concerts, most recently in the spring of 2001, as well as in performances of West Side
Story in 1992 and The Pirates of Penzance in 1993.

In 2001, Dr. Mary Hopper, longtime director of Women's Chorale, became the seventh
director of the Men's Glee Club.  The Club went abroad in the summer of 2003 with a trip
to Eastern Europe, where it last appeared with the Women's Chorale in 1994.  John Nelson
conducted the Glee Club and other campus choirs in several large works during this time,
including Handel’s Messiah, Britten’s War Requiem, the Berlioz Requiem and most recently in 2010 with the performance of the Brahms' Ein Deutsches Requiem.  Also in October 2010, the Club took a trip to the wilds of the "Great White North", performing in churches and schools in the Twin Cities area.

In 2007
the Club commemorated 100 years of existence by inviting all Old Men to campus for the
Spring Concert and several other events. And in the summer of 2013, the Club reignited a long tradition of touring Europe by performing a number of concerts throughout France.

In 2017, the Men's Glee Club was invited to sing at the 2017 Silk Road Maritime Choral Festival in Hainan, China. This is the first time that the Club had toured in Asia. After performing in several Beijing churches, the Glee Club sang in the international festival with choirs from around the globe. The Glee Club performed with choirs from nations including Malaysia, Russia, and Pakistan. The club repertoire included "Sure on This Shining Night," "Betelehemu," "I Want Jesus to Walk with Me," and "Walk in Jerusalem." 

In 2022 Dr. Mary Hopper retired after directing the Men's Glee Club and Women's Chorale for 21 years. Dr. Jerry Blackstone was chosen to serve as the interim director for the 2022-23 year.

Motto

The motto of the Men's Glee Club, "Veritas. Integritas. Fraternitas." means "Truth. Integrity. Brotherhood."  Veritas refers to the Club's foremost and undying commitment to the truth of the Gospel of the Christ Jesus.  This leads to their commitment to Integritas, living a life of integrity worthy of the calling which they have received.  And finally this leads to Fraternitas, the love that binds brothers together through their love in Jesus.  Veritas leads to Integritas which in turn leads to Fraternitas.

Directors and terms
 Virginia Graham, 1907–1921
 George Karzenborn, 1921–1927
 LeRoy Hamps, 1927–1931
 Dr. William “Uncle Bill” Nordin, 1931–1958
 Clayton E. Halvorsen, 1958–1988
 Dr. Gerard Sundberg, 1988–2001
 Dr. Mary Hopper, 2001–2022
 Dr. Jerry Blackstone, 2022–present

Notable "Old Men"
 Hudson T. Armerding '41, President - Wheaton College, President - National Association of Evangelicals
 Richard C. Halverson '39, Chaplain - United States Senate, Chairman - World Vision U.S.
 Martin O'Donnell '77, Composer - best known for his work on the Halo soundtrack.
 Dr. James R. Appleton, President - University of Redlands
 Jonathan Lewis '72, President/CEO - Partners International
 Dr. Eugene Frost '75, Head of School - Wheaton Academy
 Jerry Blackstone - Grammy Award Winning Choral Conductor
 Niel Nielson - Covenant College, President

References

External links
 History of the Men's Glee Club at Wheaton Conservatory of Music

Glee clubs
Wheaton College (Illinois)
1907 establishments in Illinois
Musical groups established in 1907